The 2000 WNBA season was the fourth season for the Houston Comets. The Comets won their fourth WNBA Finals and their last title in franchise history before disbanding in 2008.

WNBA Draft

Regular season

Season standings

Season Schedule

Playoffs

Awards and honors
Cynthia Cooper, WNBA Finals MVP Award
Cynthia Cooper, Best WNBA Player ESPY Award
Sheryl Swoopes, WNBA Most Valuable Player Award
Sheryl Swoopes, WNBA Defensive Player of the Year Award

References

External links 
 Comets on Basketball Reference

 

Houston Comets seasons
Houston
Houston
Western Conference (WNBA) championship seasons
Women's National Basketball Association championship seasons